Inferno Peak is a peak  north of Le Couteur Peak in the northern end of the Millen Range, Antarctica. It was so named by the southern party of the New Zealand Federated Mountain Clubs Antarctic Expedition (NZFMCAE), 1962–63, because geologic examination showed it contained the granite/greywacke contact, with baking of the sedimentary rock imparting a reddish color to the peak.

References

Mountains of Victoria Land
Borchgrevink Coast